Dropbox is the self-titled debut album by American rock band Dropbox, released on April 13, 2004.

The music video for the opening track, "Wishbone", was frequently played on MTV2's Headbangers Ball and Fuse. The song was also featured in a commercial for the Transformers video game in 2004.

Track listing 
All songs written by John Kosco and Lee Richards, except for where noted.
 "Wishbone" – 3:51
 "I Feel Fine" – 3:41
 "Nowhere Man" – 3:11
 "End of Days"- (Kosco, Joe Wilkinson) – 3:28
 "Forgotten Song" – 3:43
 "Take Away the Sun" – 3:53
 "Run" – 3:01
 "Unfold" (Kosco, Wilkinson) – 3:49
 "Fall Away" – 3:42
 "I Told You" (Kosco) – 3:11
 "Nobody Cares" (Richards) – 3:24

Personnel
 John Kosco – vocals
 Lee Richards – guitar
 Joe Wilkinson- guitar
 Jim Preziosa – bass
 Bob Jenkins – drums
 Sully Erna – drums on all tracks except 6, 10, 11

References

2004 debut albums
Dropbox (band) albums
Albums produced by Dave Jerden